The Battle of Chrysopolis was fought on 18 September 324 at Chrysopolis (modern Üsküdar), near Chalcedon (modern Kadıköy), between the two Roman emperors Constantine I and Licinius. The battle was the final encounter between the two emperors. After his navy's defeat in the Battle of the Hellespont, Licinius withdrew his forces from the city of Byzantium across the Bosphorus to Chalcedon in Bithynia. Constantine followed, and won the subsequent battle. This left Constantine as the sole emperor, ending the period of the Tetrarchy.

Background
The navy of Licinius had suffered a catastrophic defeat at the Battle of the Hellespont. His admiral, Abantus, had been outfought by Constantine's son, the caesar Crispus, despite the latter's distinctly smaller fleet. Following this naval victory, Constantine crossed over to Asia Minor. An army, under the command of Licinius' newly appointed co-emperor Martinian, was guarding the coast at Lampsacus on the Hellespont. Constantine had a flotilla of light transports built on the Bosphorus, allowing him to avoid that army entirely when crossing into Asia Minor.

Following the destruction of his naval forces, Licinius evacuated the garrison of Byzantium, which subsequently joined his main army in Chalcedon on the Asiatic shore of the Bosphorus. From there he also summoned Martinian's forces and a band of Visigothic auxiliaries, under their leader Aliquaca (or Alica), to reinforce his principal army, as it had been depleted by its earlier defeat at the Battle of Adrianople. It is not clear whether Martinian's forces reached Licinius before September 18, when Licinius was brought to battle by Constantine.

Battle
Constantine's army landed on the Asiatic shore of the Bosphorus at a place called the Sacred Promontory and marched southward towards Chalcedon. Licinius moved his army a few miles north towards Chrysopolis. Constantine's army reached the environs of Chrysopolis before the forces of Licinius. Following a retreat to his tent to seek divine guidance, Constantine decided to take the initiative.

The religious aspect of the conflict was reflected in Licinius drawing up his battle lines with images of the pagan gods of Rome prominently displayed, whilst Constantine's army fought under his talismanic Christian standard, the labarum. Licinius had developed a superstitious dread of the labarum and forbade his troops from attacking it, or even looking directly at it.

Constantine seemingly eschewed any subtlety of manoeuvre, he launched a single massive frontal assault on Licinius' troops and routed them. He won a decisive victory in what was a very large-scale battle. According to the fifth-century historian Zosimus, “There was great slaughter at Chrysopolis.” Licinius was reported to have lost 25,000 to 30,000 men, with thousands more breaking and running in flight. Licinius managed to escape and gathered around 30,000 of his surviving troops at the city of Nicomedia.

Aftermath
Recognising that his surviving forces in Nicomedia could not stand against Constantine's victorious army, Licinius was persuaded to throw himself on the mercy of his enemy. Constantia, Constantine's half-sister and Licinius' wife, acted as intermediary. Initially, yielding to the pleas of his sister, Constantine spared the life of his brother-in-law, but some months later he ordered his execution, thereby breaking his solemn oath. This occurred because Licinius was suspected of treasonable actions, and the army command pressed for his execution. A year later, Constantine's nephew, the younger Licinius, also fell victim to the emperor's anger or suspicions. He was executed in 326 and had his name expunged from official inscriptions.

In defeating his last foe, Licinius, Constantine became the sole emperor of the Roman Empire; the first such since the elevation of Maximian to the status of Augustus by Diocletian in April 286. After his conquest of the eastern portion of the Roman Empire, Constantine made the momentous decision to give the east its own capital, and the empire as a whole its second. He chose the city of Byzantium—renamed Constantinopolis—as the site of this new foundation.

See also
Battle of Adrianople
Late Roman army

Footnotes

References
Primary sources
Eusebius, Life of Constantine, Translated by Ernest Cushing Richardson, From Nicene and Post-Nicene Fathers, Second Series, Vol. 1, Edited by Philip Schaff and Henry Wace. Buffalo, NY: Christian Literature Publishing Co. (1890).
Zosimus, Historia nova, English translation: R.T. Ridley, Zosimus: New History, Byzantina Australiensia 2, Canberra (1982).

Secondary sources
Dunstan, W.E. (2010) Rome, Rowman & Littlefield Publishers, Lanham MD 
Grant, Michael (1985), The Roman Emperors: A biographical Guide to the Rulers of Imperial Rome 31 BC–AD 476, London. 
Grant, Michael (1993), The Emperor Constantine, London. 
Lenski, Noel E. (2011) The Cambridge Companion to the Age of Constantine, Cambridge University Press.
Odahl, C.M., (2004) Constantine and the Christian Empire, Routledge 2004. 
Parker, H. M. D. and Warmington, B. H. (1958) A History of the Roman World from A.D. 138 to 337, Methuen.
Stephenson, P. (2009) Constantine: Unconquered Emperor, Christian Victor, Quercus, London

324
Chrysopolis
Chrysopolis 324
Roman Bithynia
Chrysopolis
320s in the Roman Empire